The 2004 Wyoming Democratic presidential caucuses took place on February 3, 2004, as part of the 2004 Democratic Party presidential primaries. The delegate allocation is Proportional, the candidates are awarded delegates in proportion to the percentage of votes received.

Because Kerry had already won the nomination, and the small number of people in the state that are registered Democrats, the turnout was extremely low.

Results

See also
 2004 Democratic Party presidential primaries

References

Wyoming
Democratic caucuses
2004